radio 100,7 is a public service radio station in the Grand Duchy of Luxembourg. Broadcasting in the Luxembourgish language, the station's principal focus is on culture and information, although entertainment – in the form of a relatively wide spectrum of music, with the accent on classical – also features prominently.

History
Established under the provisions of Luxembourg's Electronic Media Act of July 1991, and run by the Établissement de Radiodiffusion Socioculturelle du Grand-Duché de Luxembourg (ERSL), the station began broadcasting on 19 September 1993 as honnert, 7: de soziokulturelle radio ("one hundred point seven: the socio-cultural radio station"). The name, derived from its allocated FM frequency of 100.7 MHz, was changed in 2002 to the somewhat snappier "Radio 100,7".

Radio 100,7 has been a member of the European Broadcasting Union since 1997 and co-operates closely with other European public-service broadcasters.

Programming
On weekdays, the station offers a 1-hour English-language program, Time Out, presented by Benny Brown, which starts at 6:35 pm, with a roundup of the day’s main national news, and a mix of music that is rarely found on the radio nowadays (Blues, Rock, Country, Indie Rock).

In 2015, the radio launched for the first time in Luxembourg a competition for original radio plays. In the spring of 2016, a second contest started under the theme “Social media and their impact on time and culture”.

See also
List of radio stations in Luxembourg

References

External links
Official website (in Luxembourgish)

European Broadcasting Union members
Publicly funded broadcasters
Radio stations established in 1993
Radio stations in Luxembourg
1993 establishments in Luxembourg
Luxembourgish-language mass media